Goli Bolagh-e Gonbadlu (also Romanized as Golī Bolāgh-e Gonbadlū; also known as Golī Bolāghī) is a village in Qaranqu Rural District, in the Central District of Hashtrud County, East Azerbaijan Province, Iran. At the 2006 census, its population was 43, in 12 families.

References 

Towns and villages in Hashtrud County